Salida is an unincorporated community in Becker Township, Sherburne County, Minnesota, United States. The community is near the junction of U.S. Highway 10 and Sherburne County Road 11. Nearby towns include Becker and Big Lake.

References

Unincorporated communities in Minnesota
Unincorporated communities in Sherburne County, Minnesota